The 2015 Calgary Stampeders season was the 58th season for the team in the Canadian Football League and their 81st overall. The Stampeders finished in second place in the West Division with a 14-4 record in John Hufnagel's last year as head coach before he hands over the reins to offensive coordinator Dave Dickenson in 2016. 

With Ottawa's defeat of Montreal on October 1, Calgary qualified for the playoffs for the 11th straight season. The Stampeders gained home field advantage in the 2015 West Division playoffs with their Week 15 win over the Hamilton Tiger-Cats, in the team's first visit to Tim Hortons Field. The Stampeders defeated the BC Lions in the West Semi-Final, but lost to the Edmonton Eskimos in the West Final game and failed to defend their Grey Cup title.

Offseason

CFL Draft

The 2015 CFL Draft took place on May 12, 2015. The Stampeders had eight selections in the seven-round draft after acquiring an additional pick in the third round with the trade of Justin Phillips. Their fourth-round pick was swapped for Montreal's third-round pick after conditions were met following the Larry Taylor trade.

Preseason

Regular season

Standings

Schedule

Post season

Schedule

Team

Roster

Coaching staff

References

Calgary Stampeders seasons
2015 Canadian Football League season by team
2015 in Alberta